The Ab Malakh waterfalls is a set of waterfalls in Ab Malakh (also Romanized as Āb Malakh) (literally Locust Water), near the village of Ab Malakh in Padena-ye Sofla Rural District, Padena District, Semirom County, Isfahan Province, Iran.
According to local legend, the waterfalls have water which can be used to kill Locusts due to the chemical contents of the water.

The waterfalls are also known as Takht-e Soleiman, or "the seat of Soleiman".
The waterfall overflows into the Ab Malakh river at both ends of a tunnel through which the Ab Malakh flows.
The waterfall was reported to be threatened by local development in 2014.

See also

References 

Populated places in Semirom County